Christine Pauli (born 19 November 1999) is an Australian rugby league footballer who plays as a  for the Parramatta Eels and formerly the St George Illawarra Dragons in the NRL Women's Premiership and the South Sydney Rabbitohs in the NSWRL Women's Premiership.

She is a Samoan international.

Background
Paul was born in Bankstown, New South Wales and is of Samoan descent. She played her junior rugby league for the Mt Druitt Lions. Her older brother, Pauli, is a professional rugby league player for the Salford Red Devils.

Playing career
In 2017, Pauli played for the Parramatta Eels in the Tarsha Gale Cup. In 2018, she joined Penrith Brothers in the NSWRL Women's Premiership. In 2018 and 2019, she represented NSW City at the Women's National Championships.

On 22 June 2019, Pauli represented Samoa in their 46–8 win over New Zealand.

In 2020, Pauli joined the South Sydney Rabbitohs NSWRL Women's Premiership team. In September 2020, she joined the St George Illawarra Dragons NRL Women's Premiership team. In Round 1 of the 2020 NRLW season, she made her debut for the Dragons in an 18–4 loss to the Sydney Roosters.

References

External links
St George Illawarra Dragons profile

1999 births
Living people
Australian sportspeople of Samoan descent
Australian female rugby league players
Rugby league second-rows
St. George Illawarra Dragons (NRLW) players